Singapore national youth football team may refer to:

Singapore national under-16 football team
Singapore national under-19 football team
Singapore national under-21 football team
Singapore national under-22 football team
Singapore national under-23 football team